Giuliano Pancaldi (born 1946) is an Italian historian of science.

Pancaldi is Professor of the History of Science, retired, at the University of Bologna. His books include:

 Darwin in Italy: Science across Cultural Frontiers.
 Volta: Science and Culture in the Age of Enlightenment.

He was a co-editor of The Oxford Companion to the History of Modern Science (Oxford University Press, 2003).

References

External links
 Giuliano Pancaldi on Academia.edu

1946 births
Living people
Academic staff of the University of Bologna
Historians of science